Křivánek (feminine Křivánková) is a Czech surname. Notable people with the surname include:

 Ondřej Křivánek (born 1950), Czech physicist
 Petr Křivánek (born 1970), Czech footballer
 Tomáš Křivánek (born 1966), Czech canoeist

Czech-language surnames